The ob/ob or obese mouse is a mutant mouse that eats excessively due to mutations in the gene responsible for the production of leptin and becomes profoundly obese. It is an animal model of type II diabetes. Identification of the gene mutated in ob led to the discovery of the hormone leptin, which is important in the control of appetite.

The first ob/ob mouse arose by chance in a colony at the Jackson Laboratory in 1949. The mutation is recessive. Mutant mice are phenotypically indistinguishable from their unaffected littermates at birth, but gain weight rapidly throughout their lives, reaching a weight three times that of unaffected mice. ob/ob mice develop high blood sugar, despite an enlargement of the pancreatic islets and increased levels of insulin.

The gene affected by the ob mutation was identified by positional cloning. The gene produces a hormone, called leptin, that is produced predominantly in adipose tissue. One role of leptin is to regulate appetite by signalling to the brain that the animal has had enough to eat. Since the ob/ob mouse cannot produce leptin, its food intake is uncontrolled by this mechanism.

See also 
 Zucker rat

References

External links 
 Ingalls AM, Dickie MM, Snell GD (December 1950). "Obese, a new mutation in the house mouse." J. Hered. 41 (12): 317-8.

Laboratory mouse strains
Classical genetics